Anne Green (born 1891, Savannah, Georgia, d. 1979, Paris) was an American writer and translator, the sister of Julien Green. While a child, Green's parents moved to France, where her father, ruined by a financial crisis and poor investments, came to settle. She spent her childhood in Le Havre, before her parents moved to Paris, where her brother Julien was born. She and her brother both participated in World War I, in which she volunteered as an ambulance driver.

Her best known work is the 1948 With Much Love, a fictionalized account of her childhood memories. She wrote fifteen novels and several volumes of short stories, most in her native English. She collaborated with her brother Julien in translating works by other authors, such as Charles Péguy, as well as his own works.

Bibliography

Author
The Selbys, 1930.
Reader, I Married Him, 1931.
Marietta, 1932.
A Marriage of Convenience, 1933.
Fools Rush in, 1934.
That Fellow Perceval, 1935.
Winchester House, 1936.
16 Rue Cortambert, 1937.
The Silent Duchess, 1939.
The Delamer Curse, 1940.
Just before Dawn, 1943.
With Much Love, Harper & Row (1948) (published as Mes Jours Évanouis, literal translation, My Vanished Days, Plon, Paris) (1951) (translated from the English by Marie Canavaggia)
La Porte des songes, 1969.

Translator
A Certain Smile, Francoise Sagan (1956)
The Green Paradise: Autobiography, Volume 1 (1900-1916), Julien Green. Marion Boyars Publishers (1992), 
Each Man in His Darkness, Julien Green. (reissued 1996) 
Bases Verities: Prose and Poetry, Charles Peguy (co-translated with Julien). Pantheon Books (1945)
Diary, 1928-1957, Julien Green. (selected by Kurt Wolff) (1964)

References

American expatriates in France
Writers from Savannah, Georgia
1891 births
1979 deaths
20th-century translators
20th-century American women writers
American writers in French